is a dark centaur and damocloid on a retrograde and highly eccentric orbit from the outer region of the Solar System. It was first observed on 23 January 2006 by the Catalina Sky Survey at the Catalina Station near Tucson, Arizona, United States. It has not been observed since 2008.

See also 
 
  – retrograde centaur, damocloid, and potential co-orbital with Saturn
  – another retrograde centaur, damocloid, and potential co-orbital with Saturn

Notes

References

External links 
 2006 BZ8, Seiichi Yoshida, MISAO Project, 31 July 2010
 

Damocloids

Minor planet object articles (unnumbered)
Discoveries by the Catalina Sky Survey
20060123
Minor planets with a retrograde orbit